Teng Huo-tu (1911–1978) was an ichthyologist with the Taiwan Fisheries Research Institute. Much of his work involved classification of chondricthyes, especially sharks.

In 1959, Teng officially described the smalleye pygmy shark.

While at the Fisheries Research Institute, Teng directed the construction of the Hai Kung, the first Taiwanese ship to complete an Antarctic expedition, in 1977.

References

1911 births
1978 deaths
Taiwanese ichthyologists
20th-century zoologists